Junior ESSEC is a junior enterprise in Cergy, France, on the campus of ESSEC Business School. Founded in 1967, it is the oldest junior enterprise. Junior ESSEC then lobbied for the official recognition of this specific type of company. In 1969, the first national organisation for the defense of the interests of junior enterprises (CNJE) was created.

Junior ESSEC engages in marketing and consulting studies and surveys in sectors including luxury, consumer and retail, healthcare, TMT, financial institutions, strategy consulting, industrials

In 2015 Junior ESSEC generated a turnover of €1.8m, managing 250 consulting studies for external clients.

History 

Junior ESSEC was founded in 1967 by Pierre-Marie Thauvin, an ESSEC student. Junior ESSEC, along with 5 other early junior enterprises created in the next years in other French Grandes Ecoles, created in 1969 the CNJE, the first national organisation to protect the interests of junior enterprises.

Major Aspects

Recruitment 
Members are recruited after having successfully passed through 8 rounds of interviews and a final assessment center where they are challenged on consulting cases.

Administrators 
Project managers at Junior ESSEC are asked for a 2 years commitment. During the first year, the 8 junior members are involved as project managers, before joining Junior ESSEC's board during their second year. Each consulting mission is managed by one junior member (first year at Junior ESSEC) and one senior member (second year at Junior ESSEC).

Main Businesses 

Junior ESSEC is active on the following areas of business:
 Market study
 Customer survey
 Business plan
 Business process reorganization

Position on the French junior enterprise market 

The French junior enterprise market is a sub-segment of the consulting market which turned over €7.0m in 2008.

Legal status 

Junior ESSEC is a French association defined by the status of the 1901 law, and a member of CNJE, the French Junior Enterprise Confederation.

Sources 

Student organizations established in 1967